Army Red (also known as Army XI) is one of football sections that represents Indian Army. The team regularly participates in the Durand Cup, as well as various regional tournaments. 

They also participate in the divisions of the Calcutta Football League.

Honours

League
CFL First Division
Champions (1): 2022

Cup
 Durand Cup
 Champions (1): 2005
 Runners-up (1): 2002–03

 IFA Shield
 Runners-up (1): 1991

 Sikkim Gold Cup
 Champions (1): 1999
 Runners-up (5): 1994, 1998, 2006, 2008, 2018

 Darjeeling Gold Cup
 Champions (1): 2010

 Kalinga Cup
 Champions (2): 2010, 2016
 Runners-up (1): 2009

 Mohan Kumar Mangalam Football Tournament
 Champions (1): 2006

International
  Tribhuvan Challenge Shield
 Winners (2): 1955, 1956 (as Indian Army Club)

See also
 Army Green
 Indian Air Force
 Indian Navy
 Services football team
 Indian Army Service Corps

References

Football clubs in Kolkata
Military association football clubs in India
Organizations with year of establishment missing